Newtownards is a civil parish in County Down, Northern Ireland. It is situated in the historic baronies of Ards Lower and Castlereagh Lower.

Settlements
Settlements within Newtownards civil parish include:
Newtownards

Townlands
Newtownards civil parish contains the following townlands:

Ballyalicock
Ballyalton
Ballybarnes
Ballyblack
Ballycullen
Ballyhaft
Ballyharry
Ballyhenny
Ballymagreehan
Ballymoney
Ballyreagh
Ballyrogan
Ballyskeagh High
Ballyskeagh Lower
Ballywatticock
Bootown
Commons
Corporation North
Corporation South
Craigogantlet
Cronstown
Crossnamuckley
Drumawhyu
Drumhirk
Greengraves
Gregstown
Killarn
Loughriscouse
Milecross
Movilla
Scrabo
Tullynagardy
Whitespots

See also
List of civil parishes of County Down

References